Neil Stanley Gibson (25 March 1962 – 3 January 1999) was a New Zealand rower.

Gibson was born in 1962 in Blenheim, New Zealand. In 1986 he won a silver medal in the coxless four at the Commonwealth Games in Edinburgh in a boat with Shane O'Brien, Andrew Stevenson, and Don Symon. He also won a bronze medal with the men's eight.

He represented New Zealand at the 1988 Summer Olympics in the coxless four in a team with Campbell Clayton-Greene, Bill Coventry, and Geoff Cotter, where they came seventh. He is listed as New Zealand Olympian athlete number 552 by the New Zealand Olympic Committee.

He died on 3 January 1999 in Christchurch of cancer.

References

1962 births
1999 deaths
New Zealand male rowers
Rowers at the 1988 Summer Olympics
Olympic rowers of New Zealand
Sportspeople from Blenheim, New Zealand
Commonwealth Games medallists in rowing
Commonwealth Games silver medallists for New Zealand
Rowers at the 1986 Commonwealth Games
Medallists at the 1986 Commonwealth Games